Vrbičje is a small settlement southwest of Šent Jurij in the Municipality of Grosuplje in central Slovenia. The area is part of the historical region of Lower Carniola. The municipality is now included in the Central Slovenia Statistical Region.

Gallery

References

External links

Vrbičje on Geopedia

Populated places in the Municipality of Grosuplje